Charles Howard may refer to:

Dukes 
Charles Howard, 10th Duke of Norfolk (1720–1786), English peer and Earl Marshal, 1777–1786
Charles Howard, 11th Duke of Norfolk (1746–1815), his son, British MP for Carlisle and Arundel, Earl Marshal, 1786–1815

Earls 
Charles Howard, 1st Earl of Nottingham (1536–1624), English Lord Steward and Lord High Admiral
Charles Howard, 2nd Earl of Nottingham (1579–1642), his son, English peer and Lord Lieutenant of Surrey
Charles Howard, 3rd Earl of Nottingham (1610–1681), his brother, English peer
Charles Howard, 2nd Earl of Berkshire (1615–1679), English MP for Oxford
Charles Howard, 1st Earl of Carlisle (1629–1685), English MP for Cumberland, and Lieutenant Governor of Jamaica
Charles Howard, 9th Earl of Suffolk (1685–1733), Irish MP for Carlow Borough
Charles Howard, 3rd Earl of Carlisle (1669–1738), English MP for Morpeth and First Lord of the Treasury
Charles Howard, 7th Earl of Suffolk (1693–1722), British peer
Charles Howard, 17th Earl of Suffolk (1805–1876), British MP for Malmesbury
Charles Howard, 5th Earl of Wicklow (1839–1881), Earl of Wicklow
Charles Howard, 10th Earl of Carlisle (1867–1912), soldier and English MP for Birmingham South
Charles Howard, 20th Earl of Suffolk (1906–1941), English peer and bomb disposal expert
Charles Howard, 12th Earl of Carlisle (1923–1994), English peer

Politics and military
 Charles Howard (courtier), gentleman at the court of Henry VIII of England, 1500s
 Charles Howard (Windsor MP) (c. 1591–1653), English MP for Bletchingley (1610), New Windsor (1621), Gatton (1625)
 Charles Howard (British Army officer) (c. 1696–1765), British general, son of the 3rd Earl of Carlisle
 Charles Howard, Viscount Morpeth (1719–1741), British Member of Parliament
 Charles Howard (British politician) (1814–1879), British Member of Parliament, 1840–1879
 Charles Howard (Detroit) (1804–1883), Mayor of Detroit, Michigan, 1849
 Charles Henry Howard (1838–1880), Union Army officer during American Civil War, newspaper publisher
 Charles Tisdale Howard (1856–1936), member of the South Dakota House of Representatives
 Charles John Howard (1862–?), American politician in Ohio
 Charles W. Howard (Union Navy officer) (died 1863), namesake of USS Howard
 Charles Benjamin Howard (1885–1964), Canadian Member of Parliament
 Charles F. Howard (1942–2017), Texas state representative

Sports
 Charles Howard (cricketer, born 1823) (1823–1908), English cricketer who played for Kent
 Charles Howard (cricketer, born 1904) (1904–1982), English cricketer who played for Middlesex
 Charlie Howard (footballer) (born 1989), English professional footballer
 Doc Howard (Charles Howard, 1873–1904), American baseball player

Other
 Charles Howard (FRS) (1630–1713), Original Fellow of the Royal Society on List of Fellows of the Royal Society elected in 1663
 Charles Beaumont Howard (1807–1843), colonial clergyman in South Australia
 Charles Howard (Marist Brother) (1924–2012), Australian clergyman, leader of Marist Brothers religious order
 Charles T. Howard (1832–1885), founded the Louisiana State Lottery Company, philanthropist
 Charles Howard (police officer) (1833–1909), English Assistant Commissioner of London police, 1890–1902
 Charles Howard (photographer) (1842–?), American soldier and photographer
 Charles S. Howard (1877–1950), American automobile entrepreneur and owner of race horse Seabiscuit
 Charles P. Howard (1879-1938), American labor union leader
 Charles Howard Candler Sr. (1879–1957), twice president of the Coca-Cola Company, 1916 and 1920–1923
 Charles W. Howard (1896–1966), American actor who appeared as Santa Claus in department stores
 Charlie Howard (murder victim) (1961–1984), killed in assault in Bangor, Maine, for homosexuality

See also
Charlie Howard (disambiguation)
Chuck Howard (1933–1996), American TV producer